Justine Mintsa (Oyem, 8 September 1949) is a Gabonese writer and member of the Fang people. She is the third child of twelve siblings. She earned her doctorate in English Literature from the University of Rouen in 1977. She is a member of the Haut Conseil de la francophonie. She was the first African woman to publish a novel with Éditions Gallimard, in Paris.

She studied at the Omar Bongo University.

Works 
Un seul tournant Makôsu, La Pensée Universelle, 1994; L'Harmattan, 2004.
Premières lectures, 1997
Histoire d'Awu, Continents noirs, Gallimard, 2000.
Larmes de cendre, 2010

References

1949 births
Living people
Gabonese women writers
Omar Bongo University alumni
21st-century Gabonese people